The 1975 Akron Zips football team represented Akron University in the 1975 NCAA Division II football season as an independent. Led by third-year head coach Jim Dennison, the Zips played their home games at the Rubber Bowl in Akron, Ohio. They finished the season with a record of 7–4.

Schedule

References

Akron
Akron Zips football seasons
Akron Zips football